Lake Afrera (in Italian Lake Giuletti) is a hypersaline lake in northern Ethiopia. Located in Kilbet Rasu, Afar Region, it is one of the lakes of the Danakil Depression.

It is also known as Lake Giulietti, the name Raimondo Franchetti gave it after the Italian explorer Giuseppe Maria Giulietti was slain by Afars southwest of the lake. Another name for this body of water is Lake Egogi (or Egogi Bad), which is the name L. M. Nesbitt's Afar guide gave it when the Italian explorer became the first European to see it in 1928.

The single island in Lake Afrera, Franchetti Island (also known as "Deset"), located in the southern part of the lake, is considered the lowest-lying island in the world.

Unlike other saline lakes in Ethiopia (e.g., Lakes Abijatta, Shala, and Chitu), the pH of Lake Afrera is low and in the acidic range. Although little studied, a few species of fish are hosted by Lake Afrera, including two endemics: Danakilia franchettii (a cichlid) and Aphanius stiassnyae (syn. Lebias stiassnyae; a pupfish).

Salt extraction 

Rock salt has been mined at Lake Afrera, and the surrounding part of the Afar Depression, for centuries. Lt. Lefebvre recorded some of the hazards of mining salt from the Depression, which he heard from one of the miners himself:

He said that this lake often changes its shape and place, which he expressed in these terms: the lake moves. Often, he added, on going to a place which the evening before was quite solid, you suddenly break through, and disappear in the abyss. But what is more frightful is the overflow of the waters: sometimes the lake rises like a mountain, and falls again into the plain like a deluge; entire caravans, men and beasts are engulphed. There are, however, precursory signs, of which mounted men only can take advantage, by flying at the utmost speed of the animals; occasionally some of them have thus escaped, and it is from them these terrible details are procured.

More recently, the Ethiopian Mineral Resources Development Enterprise has established the existence of 290 million tons of salt at Lake Afrera alone. Some local companies used to produce salt from the lake by pumping the brine into artificial ponds for evaporation and subsequent precipitation.

Following the 2011 eruption of Nabro, the lake is contaminated with sulfuric acid, making the salt inedible.

The highly saline Lake Afrera fills a topographic depression in the northern Afar Rift at the offset between the southern tip of the Erta Ale volcanic ridge and the northern tips of the Alaita and Tat Ali ridges. Bathymetric profiles revealed ≈80 m deep canyon (minus ≈190 m below sea level) parallel to NNW normal faults exposed at the NE shore of the lake.

See also
Lake Karum
Lake Assal

Notes 

Lakes of Ethiopia
Saline lakes of the Great Rift Valley
Lake Afrera
Endorheic lakes of Africa